This is a list of broadcasters for the San Jose Sharks ice hockey team.

Current

Television
Randy Hahn: play-by-play
Bret Hedican: color commentator
Drew Remenda: color commentator, select games
Brodie Brazil: studio host
Curtis Brown: studio analyst

Radio
Dan Rusanowsky: play-by-play
Mark Smith: color commentator, select games
Scott Hannan: color commentator, select games
Drew Remenda: color commentator, select games

Radio
KUFX is the official radio station for the San Jose Sharks of the National Hockey League. In a 2006 column, a writer for the San Jose Mercury News noted that he could only listen to a broadcast of a Stanley Cup playoff game on KUFX since his cable company did not carry OLN (later Versus, now NBC Sports Network), which had exclusive television rights to the game. That situation, he noted, provided an ironic twist to him living in the technology-rich Silicon Valley.

From 1997 to 2000, KARA was the flagship station for the Sharks before KUFX took over in 2000.

Notes
Dennis Hull did color commentary on non-televised games thru February 1992, Tom Laidlaw after; Dan Rusanowsky did televised games alone. 

Rusanowsky is responsible for producing all Sharks radio broadcasts and has worked with a variety of color commentators over his tenure with the team. Currently, his broadcast partner is rotating among Bret Hedican, Drew Remenda, Mark Smith or Scott Hannan. Rusanowsky also operates and administers the San Jose Sharks Radio Network, which began in 1991 and brings Sharks broadcasts to Northern California. Additionally, Rusanowsky is one of a select few play-by-play announcers who have called the NHL Game of the Week on Westwood One Radio Network. Until 2000, Rusanowsky had been the only broadcaster who had called all San Jose Sharks regular season and playoff games in franchise history. This came to an end when he was injured in a serious automobile accident on November 25, 2000, ending a continuous broadcast streak of Sharks games at 774. Due to the accident, he had missed 27 games.  Rusanowsky called his historic 1,000th Sharks regular season game on March 21, 2004 vs. Edmonton.  On January 29, 2009, he was on the air with his 1,300th Sharks regular season game vs. Phoenix.  Dan called his 2000th Sharks regular season game on January 16, 2018 vs. Phoenix.
As previously mentioned, Rusanowsky has done all Sharks games except for about 27 games from November 25, 2000 thru January 13, 2001. He was badly injured in an auto accident on his way to the arena that afternoon, and was unable to return until January 15, 2001. His replacements were Roxy Bernstein, Jim Blaney, Randy Hahn, Pat Olson, Ted Robinson, and Bob Stouffer. 

From 1992–93 thru 1996–97, Chris Collins did color commentary on home games only.

From 1997–98 thru 1999–2000, Drew Remenda did radio color commentary on all games. 

In 2005–06 season, Baker returned to the San Jose Sharks, joining Dan Rusanowsky and David Maley on the Sharks' radio broadcast team. He called most games with Rusanowsky, although he would occasionally be replaced by Maley when sent on assignments for the organization. On occasions, Baker and Maley joined Rusanowsky in a popular "triple-cast" format. Beginning with the 2008–09 season, Baker also hosts pre-game and post-game shows for Sharks games on NBC Sports Bay Area. He became Randy Hahn's color commentator on the Sharks' NBC Sports California broadcasts in 2014 after Drew Remenda's departure to a same role for the Edmonton Oilers. Since the 2018–19 season, he and Bret Hedican joined Randy Hahn in a popular "triple-cast" format.

Television
NBC Sports Bay Area was the home of the NHL's San Jose Sharks until the end of the 2008–09 NHL season, when their games also moved to NBC Sports California. Over-the-air telecasts aired on KGO 7 from 1991–1994 and on KICU 36 from 1995–1999.

Notes
After his coaching career, Remenda was offered a job as a broadcast analyst for the Sharks. Remenda started on radio, calling games with long-time Sharks radio announcer Dan Rusanowsky. In 1999, Remenda moved up to the Sharks TV crew, joining announcer Randy Hahn in calling Sharks games. His broadcast work with the Sharks over the years earned Remenda three Northern California Emmy Awards in the "On Camera Sports" category in 1999, 2001 and 2006. Remenda also hosted Shark Byte, a 30-minute magazine-style show on CSN Bay Area dedicated to a behind the scenes look at the Sharks. On May 17, 2006, following the Sharks' ouster from the 2006 Stanley Cup Playoffs by the Edmonton Oilers, Remenda and Hahn tearfully wrapped up the telecast by announcing that Remenda would not return to the Sharks broadcast team in 2006–07. Remenda teamed up with Hahn on FSN Bay Area (now CSN Bay Area) again during Games 3 and 6 of the Sharks Western Conference semifinal matchup with the Detroit Red Wings when McSorley was unavailable for what the Sharks called "personal reasons." The San Jose Mercury News reported on July 3, 2007, that the Sharks had made an offer to Remenda in an effort to lure him back to the team's broadcast booth for the 2007–08 season. A month later, the San Jose Sharks reported on their Web site that Remenda had agreed to return to the organization as the team's television color analyst, replacing the departed Marty McSorley. On June 17, 2014 it was reported that Remenda would not have his contract renewed as the Sharks colour analyst.

See also
Historical NHL over-the-air television broadcasters
California_Golden_Seals#Broadcasters - The San Francisco Bay Area's first National Hockey League franchise that existed from 1967–1975–1976.

References

External links
TV and Radio Broadcast Information | San Jose Sharks
Sharks Announce TV & Radio Broadcast Teams - NHL.com 

San Jose Sharks announcers
San Jose Sharks lists
Lists of National Hockey League broadcasters
SportsChannel
Fox Sports Networks
NBC Sports Regional Networks